1453 Fennia, provisional designation , is a stony Hungaria asteroid and synchronous binary system from the innermost regions of the asteroid belt, approximately 7 kilometers in diameter. Discovered by Yrjö Väisälä at the Turku Observatory in 1938, the asteroid was later named after the Nordic country of Finland. The system's minor-planet moon was discovered in 2007. It has a derived diameter of 1.95 kilometers and is orbiting its primary every 23.55 hours.

Discovery 

Fennia was discovered on 8 March 1938, by Finnish astronomer Yrjö Väisälä at the Iso-Heikkilä Observatory in Turku, southwest Finland. Fifteen days later, it was independently discovered by Soviet astronomer Grigory Neujmin at the Simeiz Observatory on the Crimean peninsula, which also served as a confirmation of the first observation. The Minor Planet Center only recognizes the first discoverer.

Orbit and classification 

Fennia is a bright member of the Hungaria asteroids, a dynamical group that forms the innermost dense concentration of asteroids in the Solar System. The group includes all members of large asteroid family of the same name. When applying the Hierarchical Clustering Method to its proper orbital elements, Fennia is a non-family asteroid of the main belt's background population.

It orbits the Sun in the inner main-belt at a distance of 1.8–2.0 AU once every 2 years and 7 months (954 days). Its orbit has an eccentricity of 0.03 and an inclination of 24° with respect to the ecliptic. The body's observation arc begins at the discovering observatory (or at Simeiz Observatory), 15 days after its official discovery observation at Turku.

Physical characteristics 

In the Tholen classification, Fennia is a common, stony S-type asteroid. It has also been characterized as a rare K-type asteroid.

Rotation period 

Since 1991, a large number of rotational lightcurves of Fennia have been obtained from photometric observations. Lightcurve analysis gave a consolidated rotation period of 4.4121 hours with a brightness amplitude between 0.10 and 0.20 magnitude. Due to its relatively low brightness amplitude, Fennia is likely spheroidal in shape.

Moon 

In 2007, these photometric lightcurve observations revealed that Fennia is a synchronous binary asteroid, orbited by a minor-planet moon. The moon has an orbital period of 22.99 hours, later revised to 23.55 hours. It is at least a quarter the size of Fennia itself – a secondary-to-primary mean-diameter ratio of ) – which translates into a diameter of  kilometers based on current estimates.

Diameter and albedo 

According to the surveys carried out by the Infrared Astronomical Satellite IRAS, the Japanese Akari satellite and the NEOWISE mission of NASA's Wide-field Infrared Survey Explorer, Fennia measures between 6.36 and 8.98 kilometers in diameter and its surface has an albedo between 0.140 and 0.50.

The Johnston's archive derives a diameter of 6.96 kilometers, while Collaborative Asteroid Lightcurve Link adopts an albedo of 0.244 and a diameter of 7.32 kilometers using an absolute magnitude of 12.835, taken from the revised WISE-results.

Naming 

This minor planet was named in honor of the Nordic country of Finland. "Fennia" is the Latin word for Finland. The official naming citation was mentioned in The Names of the Minor Planets by Paul Herget in 1955.

Notes

References

External links 
 Asteroids with Satellites, Robert Johnston, johnstonsarchive.net
 Asteroid Lightcurve Database (LCDB), query form (info )
 Dictionary of Minor Planet Names, Google books
 Asteroids and comets rotation curves, CdR – Observatoire de Genève, Raoul Behrend
 Discovery Circumstances: Numbered Minor Planets (1)-(5000) – Minor Planet Center
 
 

001453
Discoveries by Yrjö Väisälä
Named minor planets
001453
001453
19380308